Vitamin E deficiency in humans is a very rare condition, occurring as a consequence of abnormalities in dietary fat absorption or metabolism rather than from a diet low in vitamin E. Collectively the EARs, RDAs, AIs and ULs for vitamin E and other essential nutrients are referred to as Dietary Reference Intakes (DRIs). Vitamin E deficiency can cause nerve problems due to poor conduction of electrical impulses along nerves due to changes in nerve membrane structure and function.

Signs and symptoms
Signs of vitamin E deficiency include the following:
 Neuromuscular problems – such as spinocerebellar ataxia and myopathies.
 Neurological problems – may include dysarthria, absence of deep tendon reflexes, loss of the ability to sense vibration and detect where body parts are in three dimensional space, and positive Babinski sign.
 Hemolytic anemia – due to oxidative damage to red blood cells
 Retinopathy
 Impairment of the immune response

Causes
Vitamin E deficiency is rare. There are no records of it from simple lack of vitamin E in a person's diet, but it can arise from physiological abnormalities. It occurs in the people in the following situations:
 Premature, very low birth weight infants – birth weights less than 1500 grams (3.3 pounds).
 Rare disorders of fat metabolism – There is a rare genetic condition termed isolated vitamin E deficiency or 'ataxia with isolated with vitamin E deficiency', caused by mutations in the gene for the tocopherol transfer protein. These individuals have an extremely poor capacity to absorb vitamin E and develop neurological complications that are reversed by high doses of vitamin E.
 Fat malabsorption – Some dietary fat is needed for the absorption of vitamin E from the gastrointestinal tract. Anyone diagnosed with cystic fibrosis, individuals who have had part or all of their stomach removed or who have had a gastric bypass, and individuals with malabsorptive problems such as Crohn's disease, liver disease or exocrine pancreatic insufficiency may not absorb fat (people who cannot absorb fat often pass greasy stools or have chronic diarrhea and bloating). Abetalipoproteinemia is a rare inherited disorder of fat metabolism that results in poor absorption of dietary fat and vitamin E. The vitamin E deficiency associated with this disease causes problems such as poor transmission of nerve impulses and muscle weakness.

Diagnosis
The U.S. Institute of Medicine defines deficiency as a serum concentration of less than 12 μmol/L. The symptoms can be enough for a diagnosis to be formed.

Treatment
Treatment is oral vitamin E supplementation.

See also
 Familial isolated vitamin E deficiency
 Abetalipoproteinemia
 Tocopherol

References

External links 

Vitamin deficiencies